Korati is a village near Hoskote town which is around  from Bangalore City.

Villages in Bangalore Rural district